Best Solo Artist is an Aotearoa Music Award that honours solo artists for outstanding work. The award can either apply to solo performers or a singer who performs with a band.

The award was originally divided by gender, with separate prizes going to male and female artists. The awards were first presented in 1978 at the relaunched New Zealand Music Awards. The awards were then called Top Male Vocalist and Top Female Vocalist. In 1985 they became Best Male Vocalist and Best Female Vocalist, then in 2004 they were renamed Best Male Solo Artist and Best Female Solo Artist. In 2017, following a revamp of the awards, the two awards were amalgamated into the one award called Best Solo Artist.

Dave Dobbyn has won the award six times and been nominated a further six times. Bic Runga has won the award four times and been nominated once more. Jon Toogood of Shihad has won the award three times and been nominated a further six times. The award has also been won by three members of the same family: brothers, Neil Finn and Tim Finn of Split Enz and Crowded House and Neil's son Liam Finn.

Winners

Top Male Vocalist and Top Female Vocalist (1978 to 1984)

Best Male Vocalist and Best Female Vocalist (1985 to 2003)

Best Male Solo Artist and Best Female Solo Artist (2004 to 2016)

Best Solo Artist (2017 to present)

References

External links 

 New Zealand Music Awards - Best Male Solo Artist

Best Male Solo Artist
Awards established in 1978
1978 establishments in New Zealand